Eta Phoenicis (η Phe) is a class A0IV (white subgiant) star in the constellation Phoenix. Its apparent magnitude is 4.36 and it is approximately 246 light years away based on parallax.

Eta Phoenicis has two reported companions; in addition to a distant secondary, B, at magnitude 11.5 and separation 20", the primary has a reported companion Ab with an estimated separation of 6.8 AU, a period slightly longer than 10 years, a magnitude of 8.5, and a spectral type around G5V. The primary is surrounded by an orbiting debris disk.

References

Phoenix (constellation)
A-type subgiants
Phoenicis, Eta
Binary stars
003405
0191
004150
Durchmusterung objects